Nina Yurievna Belyaeva is a Russian public policy researcher, PhD, professor and head of the Public Policy Department. at National Research University Higher School of Economics (NRU HSE), Moscow, Russia. Member of Russian Political Science Association, which is a part of IPSA.

Biography
Nina   Belyaeva was born in 1957.

In 1981 Nina  Belyaeva had graduated summa cum laude from the Faculty of Law of Moscow State University (MSU). In 1986 she had passed PhD in Law defense with thesis topic: “Legal groundwork for NGO’s political activities in USSR” at Institute of State and Law (ISL) of the USSR Academy of Sciences. Nina Y. Belyaeva completed an internship of UNESCO in School of Law of University of London in 1987 and in 1991 she had finished her internship at Institute for Policy Studies in the Johns Hopkins University. In 1992 Nina Y. Belyaeva worked in Center for Strategic & International Studies (USA) as visiting fellow. Since 1993 she worked as a senior visiting fellow at United States Institute of Peace

During her scientist career, Nina  Belyaeva taught courses on political science and law in universities of Georgetown, Colorado, Baltimore (USA), Salzburg (Austria), Cape Town (South Africa); particularly, courses in English on Russian political and legal reform, on the development of new social and political movements, on comparative constitutional law etc. Since 2000 Nina Belyaeva works in Higher School of Economics. She is a member of the HSE Scientific Council, head of the Public Policy Department and academic head of the Master program “Political Analysis and Public Policy”, which is the only English-language program on Public Policy in Russia.

	At loose hours, Nina Belyaeva goes in mountain climbing, theater and choreography.

Academic interests and career
The scope of Nina Belyaeva's professional research interests include the legal basis for the creation and functioning of political institutions; the constitutional foundations of the political processes in Russia and foreign countries (comparative analysis); public sphere and public policies; organizing and conducting political analysis of the specific areas of management activities (including - educational, social, housing, immigration etc.); civil society and the state; attitude of authorities and society, including legal regulation of different forms of dialogue and cooperation (the creation of the Public Chamber of advisory committees, conducting civic forums, civil debate, civil mandates and civilian expertise); civic participation as a form of political participation; use of modern technologies in the organization of permanent connection of public and state institutions, including through the "e-democracy".

She has a big experience in participation in such international organisations as IPSA and ECPR:
Member of Editorial Advisory Board Journal of Comparative Policy Analysis: Research and Practice.
IPSA member from 1995 – now, participating in following research Committees:
RC05 - Comparative Studies on Local Government and Politics.
RC30 - Comparative Public Policy.
RC32 - Public Policy and Administration.
ECPR:
Official Representative for National Research University Higher School of Economics.
Member of Standing Group on Regulatory Governance.
Member of Organizing Committee of The First International Conference on Public Policy in Grenoble, 26–28 June 2013.
Chair of the Panel: Changing concept of “state” and “stateness” in Global Governance.

	Nina Y. Belyaeva is a permanent participant and contributor at Russian and foreign international conferences, for example:

1st International Conference on Public Policy (Grenoble). 2013.
XIV April International Academic Conference on Economic and Social Development (Moscow). 2013.
7-th ECPR General Conference Sciences Po Bordeaux, 4–7 September 2013 (Bordeaux). 2013.
International Conference “The Post Lisbon EU: An External Perspective” (Bologna). 2013.
Celebratory Comparative Policy Analysis Conference "Validating Methods for Comparing Public Policy: Academia and Government Dialogue" (Leuven). 2013.
IPSA-ECPR Joint Conference "Whatever Happened to North-South?" (São Paulo). 2011.
Developing policy in different cultural contexts: learning from study, learning from experience (Dubrovnic). 2011.
XII April International Academic Conference on Economic and Social Development (Moscow). 2011.
Forum on the Universality of Human Rights (Oslo). 2010.
21st IPSA World Congress of Political Science (Santiago). 2009.
The EU, Russia and the Global Crisis (Forli). 2009.

Expertise and public activities
	Since 1985 till present Nina Y. Belyaeva works with voluntary associations of citizens; carried out various social projects, providing them with legal assistance; advises on legal issues Russian and international projects for the implementation of social and charity programs.

President of Interlegal Foundation of Political & Legal Research, enjoying participatory status with the Council of Europe;
Expert Panel Member of OSCE/ODIHR “On the Freedom of Peaceful Assembly”;
Member of Council on Education of Russian Political Science Association;
Expert of Council of Human Rights at the President of Russia, 2012;
Member of the Board of Directors of the Association of international non-governmental organizations UIA - (Headquarters - Brussels);
Member of the Board of Directors of the "CIVICUS in Europe - Global network for citizens action" (Headquarters - USA);
Consultant of the State Duma (the Committee for Public Associations and Religious Organizations).

Nina Y. Belyaeva was an initiator and main drafter of the Russian State Law “Concerning Social Associations” (1995), as well as, being panelist of State Duma working groups on:
Russian State Law “On Political Parties”;
Russian State Law “Concerning Non-Commercial Organizations”;
Russian State Law “Concerning Charitable Activities and Charitable Organizations”;
Moscow city Law “Concerning charity”;
Moscow city Law “Concerning social services commissioning”.

Currently, Nina Belyaeva is a head of working group on the Russian Law “Concerning funds” and is taking part in drafting Russian Laws “Concerning lobbyism”.
	
Nina Y. Belyaeva is a regular interviewee on issues of Public Policy for such media as “Dozhd” (TV Rain), “Kommersant”, “Evening Moscow” and “Kreml.org”.

Honors and awards
Higher School of Economics Certificate of Merit (November 2013);
Lapel badge “For the development of scientific and research work of students” (November 2012);
Higher School of Economics Certificate of Merit (November 2007);
Higher School of Economics Letter of Acknowledgment (November 2002);
The best teacher - 2012.

Publications
Nina Belyaeva, Brad Roberts, Walter Laqueur (Foreword by). After perestroika: democracy in the Soviet Union. Center for Strategic and International Studies (Washington, D.C.). Significant issues series, 1991;
Nina Belyaeva. Russian democracy: crisis as progress. Washington quarterly, 16(2) Spring 1993;
Nina Belyaeva (ed.). Russian and American think tanks : an initial survey. Kennan Institute for Advanced Russian Studies.  Washington, D.C. 1994 ;
Nina Belyaeva (ed.). Public Policy in Contemporary Russia: Actors and Institutions. (HSE, 2006);
Nina Belyaeva (ed.). Russian Constitutional Development: Strategies For The New Institutional Design (HSE, 2007);
Anastasia Novokreshchenova, Maria Shabanova, Dmitry Zaytsev and Nina Belyaeva. Linguistic processing in lattice-based taxonomy construction // CLA 2010: Proceedings of the 7th International Conference on Concept Lattices and Their Applications, University of Sevilla, (Sevilla, Spain, 2010);
Nina Belyaeva. Development of the Concept of a Public Policy: Attention to "Motive Forces" and Operating Actors / Polis. 2011. Т. 123. № 3. (p. 72-87);
Nina Belyaeva. Liliana Proskuryakova.Civil Society Diamond. CIVICUS Civil Society Index – Shortened Assessment Tool. Report for the Russian Federation. Interlegal. 2008;
Nina Belyaeva, Giliberto Capano. Governing Modern Research University: Between Academic Freedom and Managerial Constrains / Russia and the Council of Europe: Topics for Common Agenda. A Look from Norway. Academic Papers of 10th International Session of the HSE Russian - European Centre for Multidisciplinary Research, Oslo, 1–8 August 2010. Moscow. INTELCORP. 2011 (p. 12 – 30);
N.Y. Belyaeva. Analysts: “Consultants” or “Independent Policy Actors” // Politicka Misao, 2011. Т. 48. № 5;
Nina Belyaeva (ed.).  Analytical Communities in Public Policy: Global Phenomenon and the Russian Practices / ROSSPEN. 2012;
Nina Belyaeva, Nikita Zagladin. Global Civil Identity: From Ethical Imperatives to Global Institutes/ Political Identity and Policy of Identity. ROSSPEN. 2012;
Nina Belyaeva. Double National-Political Identity / Political Identity and Policy of Identity. ROSSPEN. 2012;
Nina Belyaeva. Сivil associations in Public Policy: Forms of Participation in Contemporary Russia / XII International Scientific Conference on Problems of Economy and Society Development. The Book 1 / HSE.2012 (p. 302-310).

References

1957 births
Living people
Russian political activists
Academic staff of the Higher School of Economics
Moscow State University alumni